Insulin-like growth factor 2 (IGF-2) is one of three protein hormones that share structural similarity to insulin.  The MeSH definition reads: "A well-characterized neutral peptide believed to be secreted by the liver and to circulate in the blood. It has growth-regulating, insulin-like and mitogenic activities. The growth factor has a major, but not absolute, dependence on somatotropin. It is believed to be a major fetal growth factor in contrast to insulin-like growth factor 1 (IGF-1), which is a major growth factor in adults."

Gene structure 

In humans, the  gene is located on chromosome 11p15.5, a region which contains numerous imprinted genes. In mice this homologous region is found at distal chromosome 7. In both organisms, IGF2 is imprinted, with expression resulting favourably from the paternally inherited allele. However, in some human brain regions a loss of imprinting occurs resulting in both IGF2 and  being transcribed from both parental alleles.

The protein CTCF is involved in repressing expression of the gene, by binding to the H19 imprinting control region (ICR) along with Differentially-methylated Region-1 (DMR1) and Matrix Attachment Region −3 (MAR3). These three DNA sequences bind to CTCF in a way that limits downstream enhancer access to the IGF2 region. The mechanism in which CTCF binds to these regions is currently unknown, but could include either a direct DNA-CTCF interaction or it could possibly be mediated by other proteins.
In mammals (mice, humans, pigs), only the allele for insulin-like growth factor-2 (IGF2) inherited from one's father is active; that inherited from the mother is not—a phenomenon called imprinting. The mechanism: the mother's allele has an insulator between the IGF2 promoter and enhancer. So does the father's allele, but in his case, the insulator has been methylated. CTCF can no longer bind to the insulator, and so the enhancer is now free to turn on the father's IGF2 promoter.

Function 

The major role of IGF-2 is as a growth promoting hormone during gestation.

IGF-2 exerts its effects by binding to the IGF-1 receptor and to the short isoform of the insulin receptor (IR-A or exon 11-). IGF-2 may also bind to the IGF-2 receptor (also called the cation-independent mannose 6-phosphate receptor), which acts as a signalling antagonist; that is, to prevent IGF-2 responses.

In the process of folliculogenesis, IGF-2 is created by thecal cells to act in an autocrine manner on the theca cells themselves, and in a paracrine manner on granulosa cells in the ovary. IGF-2 promotes granulosa cell proliferation during the follicular phase of the menstrual cycle, acting alongside follicle stimulating hormone (FSH). After ovulation has occurred, IGF-2 promotes progesterone secretion during the luteal phase of the menstrual cycle, together with luteinizing hormone (LH). Thus, IGF-2 acts as a co-hormone together with both FSH and LH.

A study at the Mount Sinai School of Medicine found that IGF-2 may be linked to memory and reproduction. A study at the European Neuroscience Institute-Goettingen (Germany) found that fear extinction-induced IGF-2/IGFBP7 signalling promotes the survival of 17- to 19-day-old newborn hippocampal neurons. This suggests that therapeutic strategies that enhance IGF-2 signalling and adult neurogenesis might be suitable to treat diseases linked to excessive fear memory such as PTSD.

Clinical relevance 

It is sometimes produced in excess in islet cell tumors and non-islet hypoglycemic cell tumors, causing hypoglycemia. Doege-Potter syndrome is a paraneoplastic syndrome in which hypoglycemia is associated with the presence of one or more non-islet fibrous tumors in the pleural cavity. Loss of imprinting of IGF-2 is a common feature in tumors seen in Beckwith-Wiedemann syndrome. As IGF-2 promotes development of fetal pancreatic beta cells, it is believed to be related to some forms of diabetes mellitus. Preeclampsia induces a decrease in methylation level at IGF-2 demethylated region, and this might be among the mechanisms behind the association between intrauterine exposure to preeclampsia and high risk for metabolic diseases in the later life of the infants.
In animals it has been shown that toxins such as PCB (polychlorinated biphenyls) affects IGF II expression.

Interactions 

Insulin-like growth factor 2 has been shown to interact with IGFBP3 and transferrin.

See also 
 Insulin-like growth factor 2 receptor
 Insulin-like growth factor II IRES

References

Further reading

External links 
 

Peptide hormones
Growth factors
Hormones of the somatotropic axis
Insulin-like growth factor receptor agonists
Insulin receptor agonists